Preservation Creek is a creek in northwest New South Wales west of the town of Milparinka.
The Nuggets Creek flows into the Preservation Creek. It is a tributary of Evelyn Creek.

History
Charles Sturt camped for six months at Preseration Creek and it was here that James Poole died. His grave is seen there today. Of the event Sturt wrote "I little thought when I was engaged in the work that I was erecting Mr. Poole's monument, but so it was. That rude structure looks over his lonely grave, and will stand for ages as a record of all we suffered in the dreary region to which we were so long confined.

Sturt was expecting a vast inland sea in the inland regions and his expediting had carried boat with them. The boat was launched and abandoned at Preseration Creek when instead of a sea, they found a vast stony desert.

References

Rivers of New South Wales